Holy matrimony is a phrase used to describe Christian marriage. It may also refer to:

Holy Matrimony (1943 film), a comedy starring Monty Woolley and Gracie Fields
Holy Matrimony (1994 film), a comedy directed by Leonard Nimoy
"Holy Matrimony!", an episode of Pokémon
"Holy Matrimony" (Brothers & Sisters episode), an episode of Brothers & Sisters